Géralda Saintilus (born 10 December 1985) is a Haitian footballer who plays as a goalkeeper. She has been a member of the Haiti women's national team.

References

1985 births
Living people
Women's association football goalkeepers
Haitian women's footballers
People from Hinche
Haiti women's international footballers